Andrzej Radomski (born 30 November 1961) is a Polish wrestler. He competed at the 1988 Summer Olympics and the 1992 Summer Olympics.

References

1961 births
Living people
Polish male sport wrestlers
Olympic wrestlers of Poland
Wrestlers at the 1988 Summer Olympics
Wrestlers at the 1992 Summer Olympics
People from Koszalin
Sportspeople from West Pomeranian Voivodeship